Bear Creek is a stream in Platte County in the U.S. state of Missouri. It is a tributary of the Missouri River.

The stream flows to the south-southwest passing the community of Dye. It continues flowing to the south passing under Missouri Route 45 just before entering the Missouri River floodplain about one mile east of the community of Sadler.

Bear Creek was so named due to the presence of black bears in the area.

References

Rivers of Platte County, Missouri
Rivers of Missouri